3  is a 2012 Indian Tamil-language romantic psychological thriller film written and directed by Aishwarya R. Dhanush, the divoreced wife of actor Dhanush, who also produced the film, thus making their debut in both the fields. He also played the male lead role alongside Shruti Haasan, whilst Sivakarthikeyan and Sunder Ramu appear in prominent roles. The film follows Ram (Dhanush) and Janani (Shruti Haasan), two inter mediate   sweethearts who eventually get married. However, Janani is mystified when Ram commits suicide all of a sudden and she tries to find out the truth behind his death.

The film was launched on 5 August 2011 in Chennai, with Dhanush and Amala Paul in lead roles, the latter was replaced by Shruti Haasan, due to schedule conflicts. The cinematography was handled by Velraj and editing was done by Kola Bhaskar. The soundtrack album and background score were composed by Dhanush's cousin-in-law Anirudh Ravichander, marking his debut as a composer with lyrics written by Dhanush, received positive reviews upon release. The song "Why This Kolaveri Di" penned and sung by Dhanush, became one of the most streamed songs of all time, and also listed in one of the "Recently Most Popular (Gold) Videos" on YouTube.

The film released worldwide on 30 March 2012, to mostly positive reviews, praising the performances of the lead actors, especially Dhanush's performance, Anirudh's soundtrack and score, but criticising the narration of the film. The film won three Filmfare Awards for Best Actor and Best Male Playback Singer for Dhanush, and Best Music Director for Anirudh Ravichander. Dhanush won three awards, Best Actor, Best Lyricist and Best Male Playback Singer at the 2nd South Indian International Movie Awards. Following the success of the song "Why This Kolaveri Di", Dhanush was invited by Former Prime Minister Dr. Manmohan Singh as a Guest of Honour.

Plot
At Ram's funeral, his wife Janani hallucinates about him running away, and the film flashes back to when Ram and Janani were 12th-grade students, when Ram helps Janani fix her bicycle and tells his friends Senthil and Kumaran that he has a crush on her. He joins her tuition, in order to see her everyday, in the hopes that she will reciprocate his love for her. As time goes by, she eventually reciprocates his love.

After Janani is awoken by her maid, she tries to hunt for Ram's friend, Senthil, for knowing the mystery behind Ram's death. She enquires Senthil's parents but she doesn't find any clue. Later, she finds a suicide letter from Ram in his coat. She again requests Senthil's parents to convince Senthil to help Janani and she asks him to reveal what they were hiding from her. A distraught Senthil tells her that when she was leaving for the US, Kumaran got a job in Singapore at the same time. Upon finding out that his two friends have moved on, Ram hallucinates and almost drowns when he tries to swim past a beach but is saved. Senthil doesn't suspect anything strange and just thinks that this happened because Ram was drunk. Later on a day when Ram took a 3.2 crore loss, he kicks and kills Tom, their dog. This leads Senthil to consult a doctor, and notices him being strange having extreme emotions, the primary emotions being despair or anger. Senthil tells a doctor about Ram's actions, the doctor reveals it might be Bipolar Disorder, and if not treated, could lead to suicide. When Senthil tries to warn him by inviting him to spend nights out with him, Ram loses his sense of  control and attacks Senthil with a bottle, chair, and leaves the place. Later, Senthil finds Ram unconscious on the road.

The visit from the doctor confirms Ram has severe bipolar disorder, but Ram refuses to get admitted because of his love for Janani. To stay away from Janani, Ram then goes on a pilgrimage, causing further anguish. Janani takes notice of Ram's absurd behavior and asks Ram why he is acting weird. Later, at a club, Ram picks a fight with a drunkard who was trying to misbehave with Janani. Later, Ram and Senthil are beat up by the gang of the drunkard's friends. When the drunkard tries to kill him, Ram beats up the gang and incapacitates them. That night, Ram and Senthil get back home with wounds. Janani becomes restless seeing Ram injured. After this incident, Ram decides not reveal about his condition to Janani. Ram spends time in the hospital for shockwave treatment as his condition worsens. Janani becomes frustrated with Ram not telling her where he goes, and why. She suspects Ram of having an extramarital affair. She lashes out at him and sobs. After a while, Ram, in a manic state, tries to kill Janani, unbeknownst to her (since she was in a deep sleep) but is stopped by Senthil. This makes Ram feel guilty.

Ram requests his father to transfer his company shares to Janani, and wants Senthil to leave him to see her. Senthil refuses, and Ram suddenly bashes his head against a steering wheel, rendering him unconscious. Ram tearfully says goodbye to Senthil and leaves the car. In the present, Senthil and Janani are both crying profusely. As Ram goes to Janani's bedroom and watches her sleep, he suddenly hallucinates seeing a young girl saying "Either kill her or you die." Terrified, he immediately gets away from her bed. He goes to his office and writes a suicide note while the hallucinations continue.  Ram grabs a knife and struggles to kill himself. Janani in the present is wailing in grief as she learns her husband's fate. The film ends with Ram slitting his throat saying his final words, "I love you, Janani".

The movie includes a message in end that "Suicide is not a solution. Bipolar disorder can be treated with proper medical help."

Cast

 Dhanush as Ramachandran "Ram"
 Shruti Haasan as Janani Ramachandran (Janani), Ram's wife
 Sivakarthikeyan as Kumaran (Kumar), Ram's friend since school days (special appearance)
 Sunder Ramu as Senthil (Sanjay), Ram's friend since school days, the only one who knew Ram's condition 
 Prabhu as a businessman, Ram's father
 Bhanupriya as Ram's mother
 Jeeva Ravi as Janani's father
 Rohini as Janani's mother
 Gabriella Charlton as Sumi, Janani's sister
 Sunita Gogoi as Priya, Janani's friend
 Sumathi Sree as Eshwari, Ram and Janani's housemaid
 Badava Gopi as Teacher
 Anuradha Krishnamurthy as Senthil's mother
 Manoj Kumar as Senthil's father

Production
Aishwarya R. Dhanush stated that the script was written with Amala Paul in mind after being impressed by her work in Mynaa, but the actress was initially unavailable to do the film. Aishwarya later signed Shruti Haasan to the role.  This film's press meet was held at the Star City Hotel on 5 August 2011 in Chennai with the director, the cinematographer and the lead pair, Dhanush and Amala Paul.

The film was originally meant to begin its first schedule in October 2011 but in a turn of events, Dhanush had free dates in August and September 2011. However, Amala Paul was unavailable to start the film early and left the project, and Shruti Haasan joined the team after her Telugu film was delayed.

Music

The soundtrack and score for this film is composed by Anirudh Ravichander, marking his debut as a music composer. The song.... "Why This Kolaveri Di" was released as a single by Sony Music on 16 November 2011. This song written and performed by Dhanush, became one of the most streamed songs of all time. It also featured in the "Recently Most Popular (Gold) Videos" on YouTube. The full soundtrack album was released at a launch event, held on 23 December 2011, and gained extremely positive reviews.

Release
The satellite rights of the film were secured by Sun TV. The film released on 30 March 2012. Its Hindi dubbed version was supposed to release on 29 May 2012 but it was released in 2020. The film released with 1000 prints in Tamil. The film released in 1250 screens worldwide for both versions.

Film producer and distributor Natti Kumar reportedly said that out of the Rs. 60  million (US$1.33 million approximately) he spent on distribution rights and publicity, he had been able to recover only Rs. 47.0 million (US$0.83 million approximately).

Reception
The film received mostly positive reviews from critics. Vishnupriya Bhandaram of The Hindu wrote "Aishwarya R. Dhanush takes a twisted look at love and its meaning – when you put someone before your own existence – comes across as profound, underlining theme in the film. It fades out as a moving and tragic ode to romance, to the grand idea called 'love'". Moviebuzz of Sify called the film "poignant", quoting that "On the whole, 3 has its heart in the right place, though the second half seem scattered. Overlook these faults, and make it a point to watch 3". One India concluded that "3 is an engaging tale backed by wonderful performances of Dhanush and Shruti Hassan" and rated it 60 out of 100. Pavithra Srinivasan of Rediff rated the movie 3 out of 5, saying that "There are certain moments in 3 that defy logic at times, and sentiment rules the roost, but Aishwarya Dhanush has chosen to present a take on romance that is appealing in its freshness. The lead actors help as well. Her little thriller-twist aside, 3 is a movie that is an ode to romance, above all else." L Romal M Singh of DNA India gave the movie 3 stars out of 5, commenting that "We do not think anyone would want to watch the movie again, only because it demands too much from you emotionally. We however, plan to watch this movie once more and walk out during the interval, we'd advise the romantics to do the same."

In rated the film 3.5 out of 5, claiming that "3 is average and not worth watching in the theaters. Better wait for the DVD! It fails to meet the expectations and works only in parts, but Aishwarya had shown promise by taking a serious subject in her very first film". Behindwoods rated the film 3 stars out of 5, commenting that "3 has good performances, but is let down by slower narration".
"

There has been an unofficial remake of the movie in Turkish language. The 2015 Turkish movie Delibal by Ali Bilgin shares a similar plotline with the movie.

Awards
2nd South Indian International Movie Awards
 Best Actor - Dhanush
 Best Lyricist - Dhanush for "Kannazhaga"
 Best Male Playback Singer - Dhanush for "Why This Kolaveri Di"
 Nominated—Best Actress - Shruti Haasan
 Nominated—Best Music Director - Anirudh Ravichander.
 Nominated—Best Male Playback Singer - Mohit Chauhan for "Po Nee Po"
 Nominated—Best Female Playback Singer - Shruti Haasan for "Kannazhaga"
 Nominated—Best Female Playback Singer - Shweta Mohan for "Nee Partha Vizhigal"
 Nominated—Best Debutant Producer - Dhanush
 Nominated—Best Debutant Director - Aishwarya Dhanush

60th Filmfare Awards South
 Best Actor - Dhanush
 Best Male Playback Singer - Dhanush ("Why This Kolaveri Di")
 Nominated—Best Actress - Shruti Haasan
 won—Best Music Director - Anirudh

Asiavision Awards
 Excellence in Tamil - Shruti Hassan

Vijay Awards
 Best Actor - Dhanush
 Best Male Playback Singer - Mohit Chauhan for "Po Nee Po"
 Best Find of the Year - Anirudh
 Nominated—Best Actress - Shruti Haasan
 Nominated—Best Music Director - Anirudh
 Nominated—Favourite Hero - Dhanush
 Nominated—Favourite Heroine - Shruti Haasan
 Nominated—Favourite Song - "Why This Kolaveri Di"

See also
 Mental disorders in fiction
 List of mental disorders in film
 Bipolar disorder

References

External links
 

2012 films
Films about suicide
Films about bipolar disorder
Indian romantic thriller films
Indian psychological thriller films
2010s romantic thriller films
Films scored by Anirudh Ravichander
2010s Tamil-language films
2012 psychological thriller films
2012 directorial debut films